The Meadows Greyhounds is one of two metropolitan Greyhound racing tracks located in the Australian state of  Victoria. The track is positioned within an industrial estate in the north western  Melbourne suburb of  Broadmeadows. The Meadows is one of 13 greyhound tracks located in Victoria; it has races on Saturday nights (Metropolitan meetings) and Wednesday days (Provincial meetings).

History
The Melbourne Greyhound Racing Club (MGRA) was founded in 1955. MGRA conducted its first races at the Maribrynong track by leasing it for £100 per week. In 1957, MGRA was allowed to relocate to the North Melbourne Greyhound Oval. Racing was conducted with a tin hare. The first Australian Cup, held on the 31 March 1958, was won by champion greyhound, Rookie Rebel. Following a dispute over rent, the last race meeting held at the North Melbourne Track was on 16 April 1962. The MGRA then moved to the Olympic Park No.2, with the first meeting held on 20 August 1962. In 1994, the CityLink project resulted in the track being closed. The MGRA ended up receiving compensation to relocate the track to the Broadmeadows site. The first meeting held at The Meadows was on 8 February 1999.

Track distances and specifications
The Meadows track is a circle track and has three distances over which the Greyhounds race - 525, 600, and 725 m. The track from post to post is 450 m.

Track records

Split records

Feature races

The Meadows holds many feature races on its race calendar, including 9 group ones per year. The biggest event is the Australian Cup, which is worth AU$250,000 to the winner.

References

1955 establishments in Australia
Greyhound racing in Australia
Greyhound racing venues in Australia